Bank Zachodni S.A. was a Poland based commercial bank that offered the normal range of retail and commercial banking services created in 1988 from a part of National Bank in South-Western Poland. Allied Irish Banks bought majority of its shares in 1999 and  merged it with Wielkopolski Bank Kredytowy in 2001 to form BZ-WBK (which changed its name to Santander Bank Polska in 2018).

References

Allied Irish Banks
Banks of Poland
Banks established in 1988
2001 disestablishments in Poland
2001 mergers and acquisitions
Polish companies established in 1988